Keith Palmer (born 1942) is a British film editor, best known for the Sharpe and Hornblower television movies, but active in feature films since the 1960s.

He won a Primetime Emmy Award in 1999.

Palmer began his career in 1962 as dubbing editor on Station Six-Sahara. Through the 1960s into the early 1970s he worked as a sound mixer or editor, on films including  30 Is a Dangerous Age, Cynthia (1967), Shalako (1968), The Strange Affair (1968),  Hello-Goodbye (1970) and Wake in Fright (1971). In 1966 he was assistant editor on I Was Happy Here.

Palmer's first work as a full film editor came in 1969, on the first eight episodes of Strange Report, a new television drama series starring Anthony Quayle. His early films as an editor were I Start Counting (1970) and Nothing But the Night (1972), and he was also editor for the BBC television series Doomwatch (1972). Thereafter, Palmer almost invariably worked as editor, several times on films made by Peter Sasdy and Jack Gold. In 1987 an unusual challenge came with Escape from Sobibor.

In 1999 Palmer received the Primetime Emmy Award (Outstanding Single Camera Picture Editing for a Miniseries or a Movie) for Hornblower: The Even Chance (1998), and for the same movie he was also nominated for a BAFTA Television Award (Best Editing, Fiction/Entertainment).

Having edited The Secret Garden (1987), fourteen years later Palmer was called on to work on the sequel Back to the Secret Garden (2001).

Films

Station Six-Sahara (1962), dubbing editor
I Was Happy Here (1966), assistant film editor
30 Is a Dangerous Age, Cynthia (1967), sound mixer
Shalako (1968), sound editor
The Strange Affair (1968), dubbing editor
Hello-Goodbye (1970), sound editor
Wake in Fright (1971), sound editor
I Start Counting (1970), film editor
Nothing But the Night (1972), film editor
And No One Could Save Her (1973), film editor
Blue Blood (1973), film editor
S*P*Y*S (1974), film editor
I Don't Want to Be Born (1975), film editor
Emily (1976), film editor
Welcome to Blood City (1977), film editor
The Uncanny (1977), film editor
Charlie Muffin (1979), film editor
Little Lord Fauntleroy (1980), film editor
Rise and Fall of Idi Amin (1981), film editor
The Hunchback of Notre Dame (1982), film editor
Praying Mantis (1983), film editor

The Lonely Lady (1983), film editor
Sakharov (1984), film editor
Wild Geese II (1985), film editor
Bad Medicine (1985), film editor
Murrow (1986), film editor
Escape from Sobibor (1987), film editor
The Secret Garden (1987), film editor
Stones for Ibarra (1988), film editor
Hands of a Murderer (1990), film editor
Iran: Days of Crisis (1991), film editor
The Winter Stallion, or The Christmas Stallion (1992), film editor
 (1993), film editor
Hornblower: The Examination for Lieutenant (1998), film editor
Hornblower: The Even Chance (1998), film editor
Hornblower: The Duchess and the Devil (1999), film editor
Oklahoma! (1999), film editor
Back to the Secret Garden (2001), film editor
Hornblower: Mutiny (2002), film editor
Hornblower: Retribution (2002), film editor
Hornblower: Loyalty (2003), film editor
Hornblower: Duty (2003), film editor

Television

Strange Report (1969), film editor
Shirley's World (1971), film editor 
Doomwatch (1972), film editor
Quatermass (1979), film editor
Hart to Hart, two episodes (1983, 1984), film editor
Jack the Ripper, two episodes (1988), film editor
Covington Cross, one episode (1992)
Spender, Christmas Special - The French Collection (1993), film editor
Scarlett, miniseries (1994), film editor
Sharpe's Mission (1996), film editor

Sharpe's Siege (1996), film editor
Sharpe's Regiment (1996), film editor
Sharpe's Waterloo (1997), film editor
Sharpe's Justice (1997), film editor
Sharpe's Revenge (1997), film editor
Kavanagh QC, two episodes (1997), film editor
Wire in the Blood, The Mermaids Singing (2002), film editor
Wire in the Blood: Right to Silence and Still She Cries (2003), film editor
Rose and Maloney, two episodes (2004), film editor
Wire in the Blood: Nothing But the Night (2005), film editor

Notes

External links
Keith Palmer at bfi.org.uk

British film editors
1940s births
Living people